Fisch is a municipality in the Trier-Saarburg district, in Rhineland-Palatinate, Germany. Its population is 414 (Dec. 2020).

History
From 18 July 1946 to 6 June 1947 Fisch, in its then municipal boundary, formed part of the Saar Protectorate.

References

Trier-Saarburg